Valdecastillo is a locality located in the municipality of Boñar, in León province, Castile and León, Spain. As of 2020, it has a population of 23.

Geography 
Valdecastillo is located 53km north-northeast of León, Spain.

References

Populated places in the Province of León